Phaecasiophora cornigera is a moth of the family Tortricidae. It is found in Vietnam China, Burma, Taiwan and India.

The forewings are pale ochreous. The hindwings are dark grey with a bronze tinge.

Subspecies
Phaecasiophora cornigera cornigera (India)
Phaecasiophora cornigera birmensis Diakonoff, 1959 (Burma, Vietnam)

References

Moths described in 1959
Olethreutini